William R. Stokes is an American politician and former Mayor of Augusta, the capital city of the U.S. state of Maine. Stokes became Mayor of Augusta on June 16, 2011, when his predecessor, former Mayor Roger Katz, resigned from office to take a seat in the Maine Senate.  Stokes is a member of the Democratic Party.

Stokes was also the Chief of the Criminal division of the Maine Attorney General's Office.

On May 7, 2014, Stokes was nominated to serve as a Maine Superior Court justice by Governor Paul LePage.  Stokes would fill the seat currently held by Jeffrey Hjelm, who LePage nominated to serve on the Maine Supreme Judicial Court.  Stokes was unanimously confirmed on July 31, and had said he would need to resign as mayor at that moment.

References

Mayors of Augusta, Maine
Maine Democrats
Living people
Maine lawyers
Maine state court judges
Year of birth missing (living people)